John Paul Verboncoeur is a professor of Electrical Engineering at Michigan State University, East Lansing, MI.  He was named Fellow of the Institute of Electrical and Electronics Engineers (IEEE) in 2013 for contributions to computational plasma physics and plasma device applications.

Verboncoeur received a B.S. from the University of Florida in 1982, a MS and a Ph.D. in Nuclear Engineering from UC Berkeley in 1987 and 1992 respectively.  He was chair of the Computational Engineering Science Program at UC Berkeley from 2001-2010.  Currently, he is president of the IEEE Nuclear and Plasma Sciences Society.

He is the author/coauthor of the MSU (formerly Berkeley) suite of particle-in-cell Monte Carlo codes, and is an Associate Editor for Physics of Plasmas.

Awards
 2013 IEEE Fellow

 2018 IEEE NPSS Richard F. Shea Distinguished Member Award

 2019 IEEE NPSS Plasma Science and Applications Committee Award

References

Fellow Members of the IEEE
Living people
Year of birth missing (living people)
Place of birth missing (living people)